Zhao Zuo, a native of Huating (华亭, now Songjiang, Shanghai) was a noted Chinese painter in Ming dynasty. His birth and death years are unknown. His style name was 'Wendu' (文度).

Zhao specialized in painting landscapes with a rich and pure brushstroke style. He followed Song Xu and was one of the representative painters of "The Su Song Style" (苏松派).

Notes

References
Ci hai bian ji wei yuan hui (辞海编辑委员会）. Ci hai （辞海）. Shanghai: Shanghai ci shu chu ban she （上海辞书出版社）, 1979.

Ming dynasty landscape painters
Painters from Shanghai
Year of death unknown
Year of birth unknown